Peyton Ford (February 24, 1911 – November 22, 1971) was an American attorney who served as the United States Assistant Attorney General for the Civil Division from 1947 to 1949 and as United States Deputy Attorney General from 1950 to 1951.

References

1911 births
1971 deaths
People from Sayre, Oklahoma
University of Oklahoma alumni
United States Assistant Attorneys General for the Civil Division
United States Deputy Attorneys General